Monika Zernicek (born 18 October 1954) is a German speed skater. She competed in the women's 1000 metres at the 1976 Winter Olympics.

References

1954 births
Living people
German female speed skaters
Olympic speed skaters of East Germany
Speed skaters at the 1976 Winter Olympics
Speed skaters from Berlin